Apache Uprising is a 1965 American Technicolor Western Techniscope film directed by R. G. Springsteen and written by Max Lamb and Harry Sanford. The film stars Rory Calhoun, Corinne Calvet, John Russell, Lon Chaney Jr., Gene Evans, Richard Arlen and Robert H. Harris. The film was released on December 29, 1965, by Paramount Pictures.

Plot
The film takes place in Arizona circa 1880s and deals with the stage coach lines trying to run from Texas through Arizona over to Phoenix and points west. The stage coach and passengers are attacked by renegade Apaches. These stage coach hands, passengers, and various AZ outlaws, all of whom are travelling through Indian country, are forced to join forces against the Apaches in order to save their lives and scalps.

Cast 

 Rory Calhoun as Jim Walker
 Corinne Calvet as Janice MacKenzie
 John Russell as Vance Buckner
 Lon Chaney Jr. as Charlie Russell 
 Gene Evans as Jess Cooney
 Richard Arlen as Captain Gannon
 Robert H. Harris as Hoyt Taylor
 Arthur Hunnicutt as Bill Gibson
 DeForest Kelley as Toby Jack Saunders
 George Chandler as Jace Asher
 Jean Parker as Mrs. Hawks
 Johnny Mack Brown as Sheriff Ben Hall
 Don "Red" Barry as Henry Belden 
 Abel Fernandez as Young Apache Chief
 Robert Carricart as Chico Lopez
 Paul Daniel as Tonto Chief Antone
 Regis Parton as Hank
 Roy Jenson as Sgt. Hogan
 Rodd Redwing as Archie Whitewater
 Dan White as Townsman Laughing at Sheriff
 Ben Stanton as Townsman Joe

See also
 List of American films of 1965

References

External links 
 
 
 
 
 

1965 films
1965 Western (genre) films
American Western (genre) films
Apache Wars films
1960s English-language films
Films directed by R. G. Springsteen
Films scored by Jimmie Haskell
Paramount Pictures films
1960s American films